Filomena Margaiz Ramírez (born 29 November 1968) is a Mexican politician affiliated with the National Action Party. As of 2014 she served as Senator of the LVIII and LIX Legislatures of the Mexican Congress representing Guanajuato.

References

1968 births
Living people
Politicians from Guanajuato
Women members of the Senate of the Republic (Mexico)
Members of the Senate of the Republic (Mexico)
National Action Party (Mexico) politicians
People from San Miguel de Allende
21st-century Mexican politicians
21st-century Mexican women politicians
Celaya Institute of Technology alumni
Universidad del Valle de Atemajac alumni